The women's artistic team competition at the 2006 Asian Games in Doha, Qatar was held on 3 December 2006 at the Aspire Hall 2.

Schedule
All times are Arabia Standard Time (UTC+03:00)

Results 

 North Korea originally won the silver medal, but the International Gymnastics Federation took disciplinary action after discovering that Cha Yong-hwa's passport had been modified and her age falsified. Her individual results since August 2006, and the results of any team she was part of, have been nullified.

References

Results
Results

External links
Official website

Artistic Men Team